The Bank of New South Wales (BNSW), also known commonly as The Wales, was the first bank in Australia, being established in Sydney in 1817 and situated on Broadway. During the 19th century, the bank opened branches throughout Australia and New Zealand, expanding into Oceania in the 20th century. It merged with many other financial institutions, finally merging with the Commercial Bank of Australia in 1982 and being renamed to the Westpac Banking Corporation on 4 May that year under the Bank of New South Wales (Change of Name) Act 1982.

History

Established in 1817 in Macquarie Place, Sydney premises leased from Mary Reibey, the Bank of New South Wales (BNSW) was the first bank in Australia. It was established under the economic regime of Governor Lachlan Macquarie (responsible for transitioning the penal settlement of Sydney into a capitalist economy). At the time, the colony of Sydney had not been supplied with currency, instead barter and promissory notes was the payment method of choice. Governor Macquarie himself used cattle and rum as payment for the construction of Sydney Hospital and the road from Sydney to Liverpool. The suggestion of establishing a bank was raised in March 1810; but it wasn't until November 1816 that a meeting was held to discuss the real possibility of such a proposal. In February 1817 seven directors of the bank were elected: D'Arcy Wentworth, John Harris, Robert Jenkins, Thomas Wylde, Alexander Riley, William Redfern and John Thomas Campbell. Campbell was elected the bank's first president and Edward Smith Hall as its first cashier and secretary. During the 19th and early 20th century, the Bank opened branches throughout Australia and New Zealand and in the 20th century in Oceania. This included at Moreton Bay (Brisbane) in 1850, then in Victoria (1851), New Zealand (1861), South Australia (1877), Western Australia (1883), Fiji (1901), Papua (now part of Papua New Guinea) (1910) and Tasmania (1910).

Besides expanding its branch network, the bank also expanded by acquiring other banks:

1927: BNSW acquires the Western Australian Bank, which had been established in 1841 or 1842.
1931: BNSW acquires the Australian Bank of Commerce, which had branches in both New South Wales and Queensland.
1942: BNSW suspends operations in Papua after the Japanese Army captured many of the towns in which it had branches and agencies, and bombed Port Moresby. It resumed operations in 1946.
1946: BNSW resumes operations in Papua.
1957: BNSW buys 40% of finance company Australian Guarantee Corporation and over the years progressively increased its interest to a majority stake of 76% and then acquired all remaining shares in 1988. 
1968: BNSW joins Databank Systems Limited consortium in New Zealand to provide joint data processing services. Around this time the bank started going 'on line' with the use of their computer nicknamed "Fabicus", the letters standing for "First Australian Banking Institution Computer Used in Sydney". Fabicus had been in use since 1958 in the processing of some records. With advanced programming, The use of this computer changed the whole concept of banking as it had been done in years previously with its combination of hand-written and machined records. Branches slowly became attached to the data processing centre and other banks slowly joined the ranks of computer-generated reports, records, and expansion.
1970: BNSW establishes a branch on Tarawa in Kiribati, which also took over the government savings bank. BNSW also gets listed on the Australian Securities Exchange on 18 July 1970.
1973: BNSW becomes the corporate sponsor of the Rescue Helicopter service started by Surf Life Saving Australia. The service is known today as the Westpac Life Saver Rescue Helicopter Service
1974: BNSW participates in a joint venture to establish the Bank of Tonga.
1975: BNSW incorporates its local business in Papua New Guinea as Bank of New South Wales (PNG).
1977: BNSW forms the Pacific Commercial Bank in Samoa as a joint venture with the Bank of Hawaii, buying into Pacific Savings and Loan Company, in which the Bank of Hawaii had had an ownership interest since 1971.
1982: BNSW acquires the Commercial Bank of Australia. The Parliament of New South Wales passes the Bank of New South Wales (Change of Name) Act 1982 on 4 May 1982, changing the name of BNSW to the Westpac Banking Corporation. The new brand incorporates the "W" motif, which had been the logo of BNSW.

Executive leadership

Chief executive
Alfred Davidson – General manager (1929–1945)
Robert Norman – General manager (1964–1977)
Bob White – Chief general manager (1977–1982)

President/Chairman

(Note: In 200:The Westpac Story on page 296 there is a chronological list of Presidents of the Bank of New South Wales 1817-1982 followed by a list of Chairmen of Westpac Banking Corporation 1982–2017.)

Coat of arms
In 1931 the bank was granted a coat of arms from the College of Arms, symbolising the 1927 acquisition of the Western Australian Bank. The arms featured an emu and a black swan (which is symbolic of Western Australia) rampant supporting a shield surmounted by a kangaroo and the emblem of the rising sun. On the shield are shown a ship, two sheaves of wheat, a sheep, a cow, and a crossed pick and spade, representing the principal industries of Australia at the time: pastoral, agricultural, mining and shipping. The motto included was "Sic fortis Etruria crevit", translated as "Thus strong Etruria prospered", a line taken from Virgil's Second Georgic and an early motto of the Colony of New South Wales.

These arms replaced the original arms known as the "Advance Australia Arms" which was similar to the first Coat of arms of Australia used until 1910, using the same kangaroo and emu supporters and the motto "Advance Australia". The shield in these arms was retained in the 1931 arms.

Heritage-listed buildings 
The Bank of New South Wales built many buildings in Australia, some of which survive and are heritage-listed. However, very few are still used as banks. Surviving buildings with heritage listing include:

New South Wales 
 341 George Street, former Sydney Head Office (1927–1932).
 107–109 Bathurst Street, Sydney (1895).
51 Mount Street, North Sydney (1931).
306 Pacific Highway, Crows Nest (1924).
 264 Church Street, Parramatta, Sydney (current branch)

Queensland 
 Bank of New South Wales building, Brisbane
 Bank of New South Wales building, Charters Towers
 Bank of New South Wales building, Gympie
 Bank of New South Wales building, Helidon
 Bank of New South Wales building, Maryborough
 Bank of New South Wales building, Normanton (currently operates as a branch of Westpac Bank)
 Bank of New South Wales building, Townsville
 Bank of New South Wales building, Yungaburra

Victoria 
 Melbourne Head Office (building demolished with the façade preserved and relocated within the University of Melbourne, Parkville campus)

Gallery

See also

List of oldest companies in Australia
List of banks in Australia
List of Bank of New South Wales buildings

References

Footnotes

 
Defunct banks of Australia
Banks established in 1817
Banks disestablished in 1982
Financial services companies based in Sydney
Westpac
Australian companies established in 1817
Australian companies disestablished in 1982